The TOZ-57 (ТОЗ-57) is a family of Soviet double-barreled high-quality skeet shotguns.

History 
Development of the TOZ-57 began in connection with the growing popularity of skeet shooting in the USSR in the 1970s. The first prototypes were made in the second half of the 1970s.

In 1977, TOZ-57 shotgun was awarded the golden medal of the Leipzig Trade Fair and received the State quality mark of the USSR. In July 1978, TOZ-57K and TOZ-57K-1S were officially announced as new models of skeet shotguns.

After tests and trials, in January 1979, TOZ-57K и TOZ-57T shotguns were shown at VDNKh exhibition in Moscow and Tula Arms Plant began the serial production of these shotguns. In summer 1981, the price of one standard TOZ-57K (or TOZ-57T) shotgun was 640 roubles.

At the beginning of 1983, it was proposed to produce versions of IZh-27 and TOZ-57 shotguns with "paradox" rifling for hunting in densely populated areas In February 1983, TOZ-57-12E was presented at the hunting weapons exhibition in Krasnoyarsk.

In April 1987, it was announced that Tula Arms Plant would begin mass production of new TOZ-84 shotgun and this gun will replace in production TOZ-34, TOZ-55 and TOZ-57. After this, production of TOZ-57 was discontinued.

These shotguns were used by Soviet teams in international shooting competitions (incl. the ISSF World Shooting Championships and the Olympic Games).

Design 
TOZ-57 is an over and under hammerless shotgun, with one barrel above the other. The design is based on TOZ-34 and TOZ-55 models, but it has different barrels, receiver and trigger mechanism

It was equipped with detachable chrome plated barrels.

TOZ-57 has a walnut shoulder stock and fore-end without sling swivels.

Variants 
 TOZ-57 (ТОЗ-57) - hunting and skeet shooting shotgun with 711mm barrels
 TOZ-57K (ТОЗ-57К) - skeet shooting shotgun with 675mm barrels
 TOZ-57K-1S (ТОЗ-57К-1С) - skeet shooting shotgun with 675mm barrels (TOZ-57K with different trigger mechanism)
 TOZ-57T (ТОЗ-57Т) - skeet shooting shotgun with 750mm barrels
 TOZ-57T-1S (ТОЗ-57Т-1С) - skeet shooting shotgun with 750mm barrels (TOZ-57T with different trigger mechanism)
 TOZ-57T-12E (ТОЗ-57Т-12Е) - custom skeet shooting shotgun for the Olympic Games and other international competitions (TOZ-57T variant with special trigger mechanism and special lightweight fore-end)

Museum exhibits 
 TOZ-57 shotgun is in collection of Tula State Arms Museum in Tula Kremlin

References

Sources 
 Ружьё двуствольное ТОЗ-57 // Охотничье и спортивное оружие, патроны. М., Внешторгиздат, 1989
 Юрий Максимов. ТОЗ-57. Спортивный потомок ТОЗ-34 // журнал "Охота", № 11 (159), 2011. стр.64-70
 Евгений Копейко. Редкое, но меткое // "Охота и рыбалка - XXI век", № 3, 2017. стр.12-17 - ISSN 1727-5539

Double-barreled shotguns of the Soviet Union
Tula Arms Plant products